Denis Athanase Bouanga (born 11 November 1994) is a professional footballer who plays as a winger for Major League Soccer club Los Angeles FC. Born in France, he represents the Gabon national team.

Club career
In July 2018, Bouanga joined Nîmes from Lorient on a three-year contract. The transfer fee paid to Lorient was reported as €3 million.
On 9 July 2019, Bouanga signed for Ligue 1 side Saint-Étienne.

On August 5, 2022, Bouanga was acquired by Los Angeles FC of Major League Soccer for a $5 million fee. On 2 October, he scored the match-winning goal in the 95th minute against Portland Timbers to win, 2–1, clinching LAFC's second Supporters' Shield and his first trophy with the club. In 2023, after scoring twice and tallying one assist in the club's 4–0 victory over New England Revolution, Bouanga was named to the league's Team of the Matchday for week three.

International career
Bouanga first received a call-up to the Gabon national team for a match against Mauritania on 28 May 2016. He made the final squad for Gabon for the 2017 Africa Cup of Nations.

Career statistics

International goals
Scores and results list Gabon's goal tally first, score column indicates score after each Bouanga goal.

Honours
Saint-Étienne
 Coupe de France runner-up: 2019–20

Los Angeles FC
MLS Cup: 2022
Supporters' Shield: 2022

Gabon
King's Cup third place: 2018

References

External links
 
 

Living people
1994 births
Footballers from Le Mans
People with acquired Gabonese citizenship
Association football midfielders
Gabonese footballers
Gabon international footballers
French footballers
French sportspeople of Gabonese descent
Gabonese people of French descent
Ligue 1 players
Ligue 2 players
Championnat National players

FC Lorient players
RC Strasbourg Alsace players
Tours FC players
Nîmes Olympique players
AS Saint-Étienne players
Los Angeles FC players
2017 Africa Cup of Nations players
2021 Africa Cup of Nations players
Gabonese expatriate footballers
French expatriate footballers
Gabonese expatriate sportspeople in the United States
French expatriate sportspeople in the United States
Expatriate soccer players in the United States
Designated Players (MLS)
Black French sportspeople
Major League Soccer players